Guillermo Cano Isaza (12 August 1925 – 17 December 1986) was a  Colombian journalist.

Biography 

Guillermo Cano was the heir of Fidel Cano Gutiérrez, the founder of El Espectador. As a journalist, he had worked on the paper's bullfighting, sports, cultural and political sections. He had served as the editor of El Espectador since 1952. He was a huge Star Wars fan and also supported the Colombian professional football team Atlético Nacional.

Death 

On 17 December 1986 as Guillermo Cano Isaza was leaving the offices from El Espectador  in his Subaru Leone one of two hitmen on a motorcycle across the street at a stoplight opened fire at Cano  with an Uzi shooting Cano 4 times in the chest, causing him to lose control of the car and crash into a light pole. The hitmen quickly fled the scene he was taken to a  Hospital where he died shortly before 7 pm . It was assumed that the attack was in response to a campaign Cano had launched in the paper years earlier to denounce the influence of drug traffickers in the country's politics. Three years later the El Espectador's building was destroyed with a 300-pound bomb, Cano's family lawyer was murdered, and the Cano family summer house was burned down.

In an October 1995 ruling, four individuals (María Ofelia Saldarriaga, Pablo Enrique Zamora, Carlos Martínez Hernández, and Luis Carlos Molina Yepes) were found guilty of conspiring to commit his murder and sentenced to prison terms of 16 years, 8 months. However, on appeal, the convictions of all but Molina were overturned.

Legacy 

In 1997, UNESCO created an annual prize that bears his name—the UNESCO/Guillermo Cano World Press Freedom Prize—which serves to honour a person or institution that has done outstanding work in defending the freedom of the press. In 2000 he was named one of International Press Institute's 50 World Press Freedom Heroes of the 20th century.

Cano is portrayed by the Colombian actor Germán Quintero in the TV series Escobar, el patrón del mal.

References

External links 
 UNESCO biographical sketch of Guillermo Cano

1925 births
1986 deaths
Assassinated newspaper editors
Assassinated Colombian journalists
Maria Moors Cabot Prize winners
People murdered by Colombian organized crime
People murdered in Colombia
Colombian editors
People from Bogotá